Inverasdale is a hamlet in the Northwest Highlands of Scotland, located by Loch Ewe, in the region of Wester Ross.

Inverasdale Primary School

In 2012 Inverasdale Primary School was "mothballed" after service to the community of upwards of 130 years.

In 2015 it was announced that Inverasdale Primary School would close permanently due to a shortage of pupils.

The old school building is currently the temporary home of the Arctic Convoys exhibition.

More information about the history of Inverasdale can be accessed in the archives of Gairloch Heritage Museum.

Notable Individuals
Kay Matheson was born in Inverasdale in 1928. In 1950 she was part of the Removal of the Stone of Scone from Westminester Abbey. The police visited Inverasdale while looking for the stone.

References

Hamlets in Scotland
Populated places in Ross and Cromarty